In mathematics, Slater's condition (or Slater condition) is a sufficient condition for strong duality to hold for a convex optimization problem, named after Morton L. Slater.  Informally, Slater's condition states that the feasible region must have an interior point (see technical details below).

Slater's condition is a specific example of a constraint qualification.  In particular, if Slater's condition holds for the primal problem, then the duality gap is 0, and if the dual value is finite then it is attained.

Formulation
Consider the optimization problem

where  are convex functions. This is an instance of convex programming.

In words, Slater's condition for convex programming states that strong duality holds if there exists an  such that  is strictly feasible (i.e. all constraints are satisfied and the nonlinear constraints are satisfied with strict inequalities).

) such that
 (the convex, nonlinear constraints)

Generalized Inequalities
Given the problem

Then Slater's condition says that if there exists an  such that
 and

then strong duality holds.

References

Convex optimization